Mistra Bay (Maltese: Il-Bajja tal-Mistra) is a bay in northwestern Malta, near Mellieħa. The bay is surrounded by cliffs and is considered an inlet of St. Paul's Bay. To the north, lies Selmun Palace. The Mistra Battery is found on the east side of the bay. Two restaurants are also in the north side of the bay, connected via a rugged road. Recent clean ups have also reduced the amount of waste found on the beach. The beach present is made out of pebbles and has been cited by Roman and Phoenician authors living in Melite.

References 

Bays of Malta
Beaches of Malta
St. Paul's Bay
Mellieħa